[[Image:Vannucchi Rizzi A for Andromeda.jpg|thumb|upright=1.2|Nicoletta Rizzi and Luigi Vannucchi in a film still on the set of A come Andromeda]]A come Andromeda (RAI, 1971), is an Italian television remake of A for Andromeda'' (1961), the BBC series based on the book of the same name written by cosmologist Fred Hoyle in conjunction with author and television producer John Elliot. The remake was still set in Britain ("in the following year") but filmed at Italian locations, and consists of five episodes of about one hour each. It was adapted by Inisero Cremaschi (who also appeared in a small role) and directed by Vittorio Cottafavi. Music was by Mario Migliardi. The cast includes Paola Pitagora as Judy Adamson, Luigi Vannucchi as Fleming, and Tino Carraro as Reinhart.  Nicoletta Rizzi appeared as Andromeda, the person created by the supercomputer, replacing the singer Patty Pravo, who was originally cast in the role, but who did not fulfil her commitments, necessitating re-shooting of several scenes.

This version still exists and has been repeated on Italian TV. It has been released on VHS, and latterly on DVD but without English subtitles. It is considered the first science fiction TV-series produced by the Italian television.

Cast 
 Luigi Vannucchi: John Fleming
 Mario Piave: Dennis Bridger
 Tino Carraro: Professor Ernest Reinhart
 Paola Pitagora: Judy Adamson
 Ida Meda: Liz Murray
 Arturo Dominici: Undersecretary for Science Osborne
 Claudio Cassinelli: Harries
 Domenico Perna Di Monteleone: Whelan
 Gabriella Giacobbe: Madeleine Dawnay
 Nicoletta Rizzi: Christine/Andromeda
 Sandro Tuminelli: Barnett, of Intel
 Franco Volpi: General Watling
 Enzo Tarascio: Colonel Geers
 Giampiero Albertini: General Vandenberg
 Edoardo Toniolo: Minister Charles Robert Ratcliff
 Guido De Salvi: Major Quadring
 Gualtiero Isnenghi: Dr. Hunter
 Raffaele Bondini: Egon
 Guido Alberti: Prime Minister
 Inisero Cremaschi: Jas. Olboyd
 Dino Feretti: Alex

References

External links 
 
 Guide to A come Andromeda 

Italian science fiction television series
1970s Italian television series
Television shows written by John Elliot (author)
Works by Fred Hoyle
Films shot in Sardinia